Mikaili Sol (born October 30, 2004) is an American-Brazilian professional kiteboarder. She has held the title of Global Kitesports Association (GKA) Freestyle World Champion six times: 2018, 2019, 2021 and 2022.

Biography 
Sol was born to an American mother and Brazilian father and is originally from Jericoacoara, Brasil. She started kitesurfing at eight-years-old. By the time Sol was 13 years old, she was a four-time Junior World Kitesurfing Champion and considered the "Brazilian Kite Prodigy" by the Kite Mag.

In 2018, at 13-years-old, Sol competed in her first Professional Global Kitesports Association World Tour and won the Air Games World Title after winning all three Big Air venues of the GKA World Tour. Later in the same year, 2018, Sol competed in the GKA Freestyle World Championship Tour and again won all three Freestyle stops to bring home her second World Title.

In 2019, Sol finished her GKA World Tour with another win in the Freestyle discipline. During the 2019 season, not only did Sol participate in the GKA Freestyle Tour, but also participated in the GKA Strapless World Tour stop in Prea, Brazil. Mika managed to throw down a perfect ten and take the win in this new discipline.

In 2020, the GKA did not crown any World Champions due to the Covid-19 Pandemic. However, the GKA hosted one Freestyle event in Isla de Guajiru, Brasil and one Distance Battle Virtual Event. Mika took the Freestyle win at both events and 2nd in the Strapless Distance Battle virtual event.

In 2021, Sol won the World Championship title for the fourth time. Mika was the first female to land 317, a maneuver that combines a 540-degree rotation and double handle-pass, and the only female to land this trick in a competition. She not only landed it in the semi-finals but also nailed it in the finals and scored a perfect ten on both tricks. Interview with Local Kiteboarding (LKB). During 2021, Porsche and Mikaili Sol work together on the Taycan Cross Tourism.

In 2022, Sol conquered World Titles in Freestyle and Big Air crowning her a six-time World Champion. 
 
Sol is sponsored by Duotone, ION, and Chameleon Sun.

Titles

2022 
 GKA Big Air Tour World Champion 
 GKA Freestyle World Champion 
 1st GKA Freestyle World tour Salinas, Colombia      	  	  	  	  	 
 2nd GKA Freestyle World tour Neom, Saudia Arabia
 1st GKA Freestyle World Tour Taiba, Brasil
 1st Brasil National Championship

2021 
 1st GKA World Champion World Champion 
 1st GKA Freestyle World Tour Cumbuco, Brazil 
 1st  GKA Freestyle / Big Tour Tour Tarifa, Spain 
 !st Brasil National Champion

2020 
No World Champion Crowned due to Pandemic.
 1st GKA Freestyle/Big Air World Tour Event Isla de Guajiru, Brasil
 1st GKA Freestyle/Big Air Distance Battle Virtual 
 2nd GKA Strapless/Wave Distance Battle  Virtual 
 4th GKA Strapless/Wave World Tour  Cabo Verde

2019 
 1st  GKA Freestyle/Big Air Tour World Champion 
 1st GKA Freestyle/Big Air World Tour Cumbuco, Brazil
 1st GKA Freestyle/Big Air World Tour Dakhla, Morocco 
 1st GKA Freestyle/Big Air World Tour Bel Ombre, Mauritius 
 3rd GKA Freestyle/Big Air World Tour Fuerte Ventura, Spain 
 1st  GKA Freestyle/Big Air World Tour  Gran Canaria  
 2nd  GKA Freestyle/Big Air World Tour Leucate, France 
 1st GKA Kitesurf Strapless/Wave World Tour Prea, Brazil

2018 

 1st GKA Freestyle World Tour World Champion 
 1st  GKA Freestyle Cumbuco, Brazil  
 1st  GKA Freestyle Dakhla, Morocco 
 1st GKA Freestyle Akyaka, Turkey

2018 
1st GKA Air Games World Title World Champion 
 1st  GKA Air Games Fehmarn, Germany 
 1st GKA Air Games Cabarete, Dominican Republic 
 1st GKA Air Games Tarifa, Spain 
 1st Junior Kiteboarding World Cup, Spain - under 15 Spain

2017 
 2nd WKL Trials Pro World Tour placement 
 1st World Kiteboarding League (WKL) Trials El Gouna, Egypt 
 1st Junior Kiteboarding World Cup - under 15 Spain 
 6th WKL Trials World Tour Leucate, France

2016 

1st Junior Kiteboarding World Kiteboarding Championship under 17 France
 
1st Junior Kiteboarding World Cup - under 15 Spain

2015 
 1st Junior Kiteboarding World Cup - under 17 Spain

References 

 

2004 births
Living people
Sportspeople from Ceará
Brazilian people of American descent
Female kitesurfers
Brazilian kitesurfers